Farman Ali Shinwari was a Pakistani militant who was named the commander of al-Qaeda in Pakistan in April 2012.  He belonged to Landi Kotal in Khyber Agency. Shinwari was a former member of Harkat-ul-Mujahideen and Harkat-ul-Jihad al-Islami.  Shinwari had a Bachelor of Science degree and a master's degree in international relations (from the University of Peshawar), was computer literate and spoke English.

Shinwari was eventually killed in a drone strike in Pakistan.

References

2010s deaths
Pakistani al-Qaeda members
Pashtun people
People from Khyber District
University of Peshawar alumni